Phạm Văn Quyến  (born April 29, 1984) is a retired Vietnamese footballer. Since his days as a Vietnamese U-16 international, Quyến was considered one of the most promising young players in Vietnam and a worthy successor to the legendary Lê Huỳnh Đức. Quyến is known for his pace, dribbling ability and shot accuracy and was also a free kick specialist.

Controversy
Phạm Quyến was a part of the Vietnamese U-23 team at the SEA Games 23 in the Philippines. He and several players of the team were arrested for alleged gambling and match-fixing scandals. In January, 2007, it was decided that Quyến would be sentenced to 2 years in prison, ending his hope of becoming a star player. Also, the Vietnam Football Federation (VFF) decided to ban him from all domestic competition for four years. However, it is rumoured that he can return as soon as 2008, if he shows good progress during the banning period. Since the start of V-League 2009, Quyến was able to play in domestic matches.

International career

International goals

Vietnam U-23

Vietnam

Honours

Club
Sông Lam Nghệ An F.C.
V.League 1: 
 Winners :      1999-2000, 2000-2001, 2011
 Runners-up : 2001-2002
Vietnamese Super Cup: 
 Winners :  2000, 2001, 2002, 2011
Vietnamese National Cup: 
 Winners : 2002, 2010
Xuân Thành Sài Gòn F.C.
Vietnamese National Cup: 
 Winners : 2012
Vissai Ninh Bình F.C.
Vietnamese National Cup: 
 Winners : 2013
Vietnamese Super Cup: 
 Winners :  2013

International
Vietnam U16
 Fourth place AFC U-16 Championship: 2000
Vietnam U23
 Runners-up : Southeast Asian Games: 2003, 2005 
Vietnam
 Third place : AFF Championship: 2002

Individuals
 Best Player of AFC U-16 Championship: 2000
 Vietnamese Golden Ball: 2003
 Best Young Player of Vietnam Football Federation: 2000, 2002

References

Vietnamese footballers
1984 births
Living people
Song Lam Nghe An FC players
Xuan Thanh Saigon Cement FC players
V.League 1 players
Footballers at the 2002 Asian Games
Vietnam international footballers
Association football forwards
Southeast Asian Games silver medalists for Vietnam
Southeast Asian Games medalists in football
Competitors at the 2003 Southeast Asian Games
Competitors at the 2005 Southeast Asian Games
Asian Games competitors for Vietnam